Chris Griffin is a North Dakota Democratic-NPL Party member of the North Dakota House of Representatives, representing the 19th district since 2007.

External links
North Dakota Legislative Assembly - Representative Chris Griffin official ND Senate website
Project Vote Smart - Representative Chris Griffin (ND) profile
Follow the Money - Chris Griffin
2006 campaign contributions
North Dakota Democratic-NPL Party - Representative Chris Griffin profile

Members of the North Dakota House of Representatives
Living people
1980 births